Lynn Valley is a neighbourhood in the District of North Vancouver, British Columbia. Located at the northern edge of Metro Vancouver, it sits between Mount Fromme and Mount Seymour. The area's natural parks include Lynn Headwaters Regional Park, the Lower Seymour Conservation Reserve (formerly known as the "Seymour Demonstration Forest") and Lynn Canyon Park, whose main attraction is the Lynn Canyon Suspension Bridge. Lynn Valley is named after British Royal Engineer John Linn, who settled in the area after 1869. The main intersection of Lynn Valley Road and Mountain Highway is the location of the Main Library and Town Centre. The area is now known as Lynn Valley Village.

Natural features
Lynn Valley is known as a mountain biking, hiking destination, and for easy access to ski hill.
 
 The forest area in and around Lynn Valley is often used as a filming location. 

Tucked between mountains in North Vancouver, Lynn Valley is a lush, pretty neighbourhood thickly bordered by parks and forest. Lynn Headwaters Regional Park, connected to the Lower Seymour Conservation Reserve, has its own attractions: from fishing at peaceful Rice Lake to trails that link up with this section of the North Shore spiderweb of walkways called the Baden Powell trail.

Lynn Canyon Park is home to the spectacular second-growth rainforest and offers a range of hiking trails for all abilities. One of the tallest known specimen of Douglas fir tree was once located in Lynn Valley. The Lynn Canyon Suspension Bridge sways high above Lynn Creek and offers a rustic and jiggling adventure for nature lovers.

Poet's Corner 
A niche of Lynn Valley is Poet's Corner, a series of street names of past poets. These include Shakespeare, Tennyson, William, Chaucer, and Milton as well as many others that weave around the outskirts of Hunter's or Kirkstone Park.

History 
Previously known as "Shaketown", the rugged beginnings of Lynn Valley consisted of shake-sided shakes to accommodate lumberjacks, cooks, blacksmiths, and millwrights who used the lumber during the turn of the 19th century. The skid road built straight down the middle called Tote Road, used for oxen to haul felled logs to the Moodyville waterfront, was bisected with "Centre Road" (now Mountain Highway), and Pipeline Road, a simple plank road along which a pipeline was installed to carry drinking water from Rice Lake to North Vancouver, which is now called Lynn Valley Road.

Lynn Valley Town Centre
Lynn Valley has a Town Centre, designed by architect Gregory Henriquez. At Lynn Valley Centre you’ll find a village plaza with a variety of charming shops. It also home to the Lynn Valley branch of North Vancouver District Public Library.

Argyle Secondary School
The primary secondary school in Lynn Valley is Argyle Secondary School, part of School District 44 North Vancouver. Construction for the new school began in the summer of 2018 and was completed in January 2021.

Transportation 
The neighbourhood is served by various TransLink buses. Bus 210 directly links the neighbourhood to Downtown Vancouver. Other convenient and scenic way to reach downtown is by using SeaBus from Lower Lonsdale.

Further reading
 Matthew Gardner and Alison Bigg (2003) Vancouver, Footprint Travel Guides, 256 pp  
 C. Michael Hogan (2008) Douglas-fir: Pseudotsuga menziesii, globalTwitcher.com, ed. Nicklas Strõmberg)

References

Neighbourhoods in British Columbia
North Vancouver (district municipality)